This is a list of all auctions and personnel signings for the 2008 Indian Premier League.

Team Auction
The auctions for team ownership were held on 24 January 2008. The base price of team was set at 50 million. The auction fetched a total amount of 723.59 million against the combined base price of 400 million. Mumbai was the most expensive team, costing over 111.9 million. The auction also led to controversy regarding the conflict of interest with then BCCI secretary N. Srinivasan holding a stake in the Chennai team.

Player's Auction

Icon players
Icon player was a status given to five players of the Indian Premier League to ensure that top drawer players will represent their respective home city sides, which was important for the league to increase fan support and interest among the locals. The icon players received 15% percent more money than the highest paid player of the team bought in the auction. Initially four icon players were designated but later on the request of Delhi Daredevils, Virender Sehwag's name was added to the list. Deccan Chargers also asked for Icon Player status to be given to VVS Laxman, but he declined the offer in order to allow the franchise to spend more money on other players and still not breach the US$5 million salary cap.

Auction-1
The first auction was held on 20 February 2008. The total salary cap was set at 5 million with a minimum of  3.3 million to be spend. Players were divided into categories with Category-A, B, C and D representing prominent players. Remaining Wicket-keepers, All-rounders, Batsmen and Bowlers were kept in category-E, F, G and H respectively. 77 players signed up for auction including 48 foreign players. 75 players were auctioned with Mohammed Yousuf and Ashwell Prince remaining unsold. MS Dhoni was the costliest player at 1.5 million. Andrew Symonds was the most costly foreign player. The unsold players were paid their base price by the BCCI. Jaipur was fined for not reaching the minimum spending of 3 million.  

 REC: Players unsold originally but were brought back.

Auction-2
The second IPL auction for foreign players took place in Mumbai on 11 March 2008. 26 players including unsold players from auction-1 signed up for the auction. The base price was set at 50,000. 14 players were sold in the auction. James Hopes was the costliest player at 300,000. Dimitri Mascarenhas became the first English player to sign up for IPL. Mohammed Yousuf again remained unsold in 2nd auction due to continuing dispute with Indian Cricket League. IPL allowed teams to cross 8 foreign players limit. Players sold lower than their signed up price were paid remaining amount by IPL.

Under-19 Draft
Along with 2nd Auction, the 15 players from winners of 2008 Under-19 Cricket World Cup along with Viraj Kadbe were picked upon draft system based upon US National Football League. The franchises were randomly allotted numbers from 1 to 8. The franchise assigned the number 1 got the choice of picking player first and then the second franchise and so on. After eight players were picked, the order of the bidding reversed.  Delhi was the first team and chose Pradeep Sangwan. Deccan Chargers passed on both of their drafts. Delhi Daredevils also picked only one of the draft while Chennai Super Kings picked three players. The players with Ranji experience were paid  50,000 and remaining  30,000.

Player's Signing
IPL franchise could sign Indian players at any time. Franchises had to pick minimum four under-22 Indian players from their designated catchment area in their squad. Praveen Kumar was claimed to be signed by both Delhi and Bangalore franchise, with the player later confirming that he had joined the Royal Challengers Bangalore. The following players were signed before the tournament.  

 N-RAN: Players having not played Ranji Trophy at the time of tournament.4

Withdrawn and Replacement players
Players were signed as replacement of contracted players who were not available to play due to injuries and national commitments. Under IPL rules, the replacements cannot be paid more than the players they are replacing, though they can be paid less. The following players withdrew from the tournament either due to injuries or because of other reasons.

Support staff appointments

References

External links
 ESPNcricinfo- Indian Premier League, 2007/08-Squads

Indian Premier League personnel changes
Cricket player auction lists